Léchelle is a commune in the Pas-de-Calais department in the Hauts-de-France region of France.

Geography

Population

Places of interest
 The church of St. Nicholas, rebuilt along with most of the village, after World War I.
 The remains of an old chateau.
 The Commonwealth War Graves Commission cemetery.

See also
 Communes of the Pas-de-Calais department

References

External links

 Five Points CWGC cemetery

Communes of Pas-de-Calais